Mohammed Rustom (born 1980) is Full Professor of Islamic studies and global philosophy at Carleton University in Ottawa, Canada and Director of the Carleton Centre for the Study of Islam. His research interests include Arabic and Persian Sufi literature, Islamic philosophy, Qur’anic exegesis, translation theory, and cross-cultural philosophy.

Biography
Rustom was born in 1980 in Toronto, Canada in a Muslim family and grew up in Richmond Hill, Ontario. His family came to Canada in the 1970s from Tanzania and are ethnically Khojas with roots in Karachi. He obtained degrees in the humanities and graduated from the University of Toronto in 2004 with an Hon. BA in Islamic studies (focusing on Arabic and Persian) and philosophy. He earned his PhD in Islamic philosophy and Sufi literature from the University of Toronto in 2009, and then took up a position at Carleton University. Rustom has studied Islamic philosophy under such prominent figures as Seyyed Hossein Nasr, Todd Lawson, William Chittick, and Michael Marmura. He duly acknowledges his debt to these scholars "as being the main catalysts" behind his interests in Islamic philosophy and Sufism.

Works
 Journal of Islamic Philosophy: A Special Issue on Mulla Sadra (2010)
 The Triumph of Mercy: Philosophy and Scripture in Mulla Sadra (SUNY Press, 2012) (Winner of Iran's 21st International Book of the Year Prize)
 In Search of the Lost Heart: Explorations in Islamic Thought (co-ed.) (SUNY Press, 2012)
 Sufi Metafiziği (Nefes, 2014) 
 The Study Quran: A New Translation and Commentary (assistant ed.) (HarperOne, 2015)
 The Condemnation of Pride and Self-Admiration (Islamic Texts Society, 2018)
 Mysticism and Ethics in Islam (co-ed.) (AUB Press, 2022)
 Journal of Sufi Studies: Special Issue on Sufi Texts in Translation (co-ed.) (Brill, 2022)
 The Essence of Reality: A Defense of Philosophical Sufism (NYU Press, 2022)
 Islamic Thought and the Art of Translation: Texts and Studies in Honor of William C. Chittick and Sachiko Murata (Brill, 2023)
 From the Divine to the Human: Contemporary Islamic Thinkers on Evil, Suffering, and the Global Pandemic (co-ed.) (Routledge, 2023)
 Inrushes of the Heart: The Sufi Philosophy of 'Ayn al-Qudat (SUNY Press, 2023)
 Global Philosophy: A Sourcebook (Equinox, forthcoming)
 Why Read Mulla Sadra Today? (Cambridge University Press, forthcoming)

See also
 Maria Massi Dakake
 Caner Dagli
 Yousef Casewit

References

Living people
1980 births
20th-century Muslim scholars of Islam
University of Toronto alumni
Academic staff of Carleton University
Islamic studies scholars
Muslim scholars of Islamic studies
Traditionalist School